Chaplain Louis (Eliezer) Werfel (1916–1943) was a Jewish chaplain who was one of only six Jewish Chaplains and the only Orthodox Rabbi killed in action during World War II.  Werfel's fellow soldiers gave him the nickname "The Flying Rabbi" because he traveled to remote locations throughout North Africa by plane.

Werfel attended Yeshiva University.  After enlisting in the Army in August 1942, he trained at the Chaplain’s Center at Harvard.

References

External links
 The Commentator - The Flying Rabbi: Chaplain Louis Werfel (1916-1943)

1916 births
1943 deaths
American Orthodox rabbis
Modern Orthodox rabbis
Religious Zionist Orthodox rabbis
Rabbi Isaac Elchanan Theological Seminary semikhah recipients
Harvard University alumni
American people of Polish-Jewish descent
Jews from Galicia (Eastern Europe)
United States Army chaplains
Rabbis in the military
20th-century American rabbis
United States Army personnel killed in World War II
Yeshiva University alumni